Javier 'Javi' Amaya Corredera (born 3 January 1990) is a Spanish footballer who plays for Juventud de Torremolinos CF. Mainly a  left winger, he can also play as a forward.

Club career
Born in Torremolinos, Málaga, Andalusia, Amaya graduated from local UD Almería's youth system, and made his senior debuts with the reserves in the 2008–09 season, in Tercera División. After a loan spell with Juventud de Torremolinos CF he moved abroad, joining Scottish First Division side Raith Rovers on 24 November 2009.

Amaya made his professional debut on 16 December 2009, starting and scoring his side's only in a 1–1 home draw against Airdrie United. He appeared in six league games for Raith during the campaign, and was released in May 2010.

On 6 October 2010 Amaya moved to Annan Athletic, but was released after only six weeks at the club, making five appearances (three in the league). He subsequently returned to Spain, joining CD Alhaurino in the fourth level.

In 2011 Amaya moved teams and countries again, signing for Yverdon-Sport FC in the Swiss 1. Liga Promotion. He appeared regularly for the side, and in January of the following year returned to former club Torremolinos. In March, he joined Næstved BK, rescinding with the latter in January 2013.

Amaya returned to Torremolinos for a third time in February 2013, and appeared regularly for the side in the regional leagues. On 31 July 2014 he first arrived in Segunda División B, after agreeing to a one-year deal with CD El Palo.

References

External links

1990 births
Living people
People from Torremolinos
Sportspeople from the Province of Málaga
Spanish footballers
Footballers from Andalusia
Association football wingers
Association football forwards
Segunda División B players
Tercera División players
UD Almería B players
Scottish Football League players
Raith Rovers F.C. players
Annan Athletic F.C. players
Yverdon-Sport FC players
Næstved Boldklub players
Spanish expatriate footballers
Spanish expatriate sportspeople in Scotland
Expatriate footballers in Scotland
Spanish expatriate sportspeople in Switzerland
Expatriate footballers in Switzerland
Spanish expatriate sportspeople in Denmark
Expatriate men's footballers in Denmark
UD Fuengirola players